Geminio Ognio (13 December 1917 – 28 October 1990) was an Italian water polo player who competed in the 1948 Summer Olympics and in the 1952 Summer Olympics.

He was born in Recco and died in Rome.

In 1948 he was part of the Italian team which won the gold medal. He played six matches and scored four goals.

Four years later he was a member of the Italian team which won the bronze medal in the Olympic tournament. He played four matches.

See also
 Italy men's Olympic water polo team records and statistics
 List of Olympic champions in men's water polo
 List of Olympic medalists in water polo (men)

External links
 

1917 births
1990 deaths
Italian male water polo players
Water polo players at the 1948 Summer Olympics
Water polo players at the 1952 Summer Olympics
Olympic gold medalists for Italy in water polo
Olympic bronze medalists for Italy in water polo
Medalists at the 1952 Summer Olympics
Medalists at the 1948 Summer Olympics
Water polo players of Marina Militare
Sportspeople from the Province of Genoa
20th-century Italian people